Latham Coddington Warren, MA (4 April 1831 – 5 November 1912)  was Archdeacon of Lismore from 1896 until 1912.

Burkitt was educated at Trinity College, Dublin and ordained in 1855. After a curacy in Rathangan, County Wexford he held  incumbencies at Lucan,  Balbriggan, Kingstown, Dublin and Clonmel.

Notes

Alumni of Trinity College Dublin
Archdeacons of Lismore
1831 births
1912 deaths
19th-century Irish Anglican priests
20th-century Irish Anglican priests